Roma Gąsiorowska-Żurawska (born 29 January 1981 in Bydgoszcz) is a Polish actress and fashion designer.  She played the role of "Sylwia" in the movie Suicide Room. She is one of the TR Warszawa theatre's actors. Roma was interested in acting in high school, where she created her own theatre. She graduated from the Ludwik Solski Academy for the Dramatic Arts. As a student, she started working in Teatr Rozmaitości. She debuted in Jerzy Stuhr's movie "Pogoda na Jutro".

Filmography

Film 
 2003: Pogoda na jutro as Kinga Kozioł, daughter of Józefa
 2004: Karol: A Man Who Became Pope as young theatre actress
 2005: Oda do radości as Marta, Michał's girlfriend
 2005: Wieża as Magda, Mateusz's girlfriend
 2007: Futro as Olenka, Maklowieccy's housekeeper
 2008: Kochaj i tańcz as Remigiusz assistant
 2008: Wiem, kto to zrobił as Karolina Mołek
 2008: Rozmowy nocą as Karolina, Bartek's friend
 2009: Jestem Twój as Alicja, Marta's sister
 2009: Moja krew jako nurse
 2009: Tatarak as housekeeper
 2009: Moja nowa droga as Alina
 2009: Zero as Pornstar
 2009: Esterházy as Ewa (voice only)
 2009: Wojna polsko-ruska as Magda
 2011: Letters to Santa as Doris
 2011: W imieniu diabła as Michalina
 2011: Suicide Room as Sylwia
 2011: Ki as Ki
 2012: Kac Wawa as Sandra
 2018: Podatek od miłości as Agnieszka
 2020: Amatorzy as Wiki

Television 
 2004: Klan as teenager in bookstore
 2005: Egzamin z życia as "Ruda", fan of "Perkoza"
 2007: Pitbull  as Monika Grochowska
 2007: Pogoda na piątek as babysitter
 2007: Prawo miasta as Ewa, Buncol's girlfriend
 2008–2009: Londyńczycy as Mariola Monika Biedrzycka
 2010: Ratownicy as Karolina "Lara" Kitowicz

Ethiudes 
 2004: 3 Love as Magda
 2004: Powiedz coś as Daughter
 2007: Zwierciadło

Theatre

Theatrical roles 
 2003: Disco Pigs (written by Endy Walsh, directed by Krzysztof Jaworski)
 2004: Dreams (written by Ivan Vyrypaev, directed by Łukasz Kos)
 2004: Bash (written by Neil LaBute, directed by Grzegorz Jarzyna)
 2005: Cokolwiek się zdarzy, kocham cię (written and directed by Przemysław Wojcieszek) as Sugar
 2005: Tiramisu (written by Joanna Owsianko, directed by Aldona Figura) as Bajerka  
 2005: Noc (written by Andrzej Stasiuk, directed by Mikołaj Grabowski;) as Dusza (guest appearance  Helena Modrzejewska National Stary Theater in Kraków)
 2006: Dwoje biednych Rumunów mówiących po polsku (written by Dorota Masłowska, directed by Przemysław Wojcieszek) as Gina–Pyralgina
 2006: Giovanni (written by Molière, directed by Grzegorz Jarzyna) as Zerlina at the Grand Theatre in Warsaw
 2009: Między nami dobrze jest (written by Dorota Masłowska, directed by Grzegorz Jarzyna)
 2009: The Picture of Dorian Gray (directed by Michał Borczuch)

Theatre on television 
 2004: Klucz as Lala
 2004: Sceny z powstania... as Łączniczka
 2006: I. znaczy inna as Nina
 2006: Zorka as Iza
 2007: Doktor Halina as Zosia

Awards and nominations
2011 Award for Best Actress for her role in Ki
2011 Award for Best Actress for her role in Ki
2012 Polish Film Awards for Best Actress for her roles in Ki and Suicide Room (nomination)

Career in Fashion
Roma is also a fashion designer. Her most famous collections are "Amor Amor", "Stygmaty", "7 Grzechów" and "Stara Bardzo". She was nominated for the Róża Gali Award as "Debut in fashion world" which she didn't win.

References

External links
 

Polish film actresses
Polish television actresses
Living people
Actors from Bydgoszcz
Polish fashion designers
1981 births
Polish stage actresses
21st-century Polish actresses
Polish women fashion designers